The YouthBuilders experience started in 1975 when Denis Bell, Youth Director for the Evangelical Missionary Church of Canada, assembled 4 college students willing to invest a year of their lives to travel to churches and high schools and help equip youth leaders and encourage spiritual growth in students. The project was very successful and continued to run about every 4 years. In 2000, the Evangelical Missionary Church invited the Brethren in Christ Church to partner with them in sending out YouthBuilder Teams. In 2002, the Centre for Student Leadership was organized to give more focused attention to the development of young leaders through YouthBuilder teams and other leadership initiatives.

In 2011 the Centre for Student Leadership changed their name to LEDGE and continues to work with church denominations to develop Youthbuilders teams.

References

External links
 
 The Evangelical Missionary Church of Canada
 Brethren In Christ Canadian Conference
 Pitch+Praise

Christian youth organizations
Christian organizations established in 1975
Youth organizations based in Canada